The 2007 Blue Square Greyhound Derby took place during June & July with the final being held on 7 July 2007 at Wimbledon Stadium. The winner Westmead Lord received £100,000.

Final result 
At Wimbledon (over 480 metres):

Distances 
½, neck, 1, short head, 1¾ (lengths)
The distances between the greyhounds are in finishing order and shown in lengths. One length is equal to 0.08 of one second.

Race Report
The final was won by Westmead Lord in a time of 28.47 seconds. The winner, who was trained by Nick Savva and was a half brother to former two-time winner Westmead Hawk, dominated the race from the very start. 6–4 favourite Loyal Honcho improved as the race progressed, but just missed out on the ultimate prize by half a length. It was the second time that a Seamus Graham trained runner had finished second in as many years.

Quarter finals

Semi finals

See also 
2007 UK & Ireland Greyhound Racing Year

References

Results
Results

External links
British Greyhound Racing Board
Greyhound Data

Greyhound Derby
English Greyhound Derby
English Greyhound Derby
English Greyhound Derby
English Greyhound Derby